is a 1986 Japanese drama film directed by Masahiro Shinoda. It was entered into the 36th Berlin International Film Festival, where it won the Silver Bear for outstanding artistic contribution.

Cast
 Hiromi Gō as Gonza Sasano
 Haruko Kato as Oyuki's nanny
 Hideji Ōtaki as Iwaki
 Kuniko Miyake as Iwaki's wife
 Choichiro Kawarazaki as Jinbei
 Naoto Takenaka as Fumiemon
 Jun Hamamura
 Shoichi Ozawa
 Shōhei Hino as Hannojo
 Shima Iwashita as Osai
 Kaori Mizushima as Okiku
 Misako Tanaka as Oyuki

Other Credits
Sword fight arranger - Hiroshi Kuze
Art Direction - Yoshinobu Nishioka

References

External links

1986 films
1986 drama films
1980s Japanese-language films
Samurai films
Jidaigeki films
Films directed by Masahiro Shinoda
Silver Bear for outstanding artistic contribution
1980s Japanese films